Seychellaxis is a genus of air-breathing land snails, terrestrial pulmonate gastropod mollusks in the family Streptaxidae.

Distribution 
The distribution of the genus Seychellaxis includes:
 the Seychelles

Species
The genus Seychellaxis include only one species:
 Seychellaxis souleyetianus (Petit de la Saussaye, 1841)

References

Streptaxidae